The 1974 European Formula Two season was contested over 10 rounds and had Frenchman Patrick Depailler as the season champion. Depailler, runner-up Hans-Joachim Stuck and some others also raced in 1974 Formula One season.

Calendar

Note:

Race 2, 5, 6, 8, 9 and 10 were held in two heats, with results shown in aggregate.

Race 5: the second heat was also originally scheduled over 20 laps, but stopped early due to heavy rain.

Race 7 was won by a graded driver shown in Italics

Final point standings

Driver

For every race points were awarded: 9 points to the winner, 6 for runner-up, 4 for third place, 3 for fourth place, 2 for fifth place and 1 for sixth place. No additional points were awarded. The best 7 results count. No driver had a point deduction.

Note:

Only drivers which were not graded were able to score points.

References

Formula Two
European Formula Two Championship seasons